Jevtović is a Serbian surname. It may refer to:
 
Dušan Jevtović (1925–2011), painter
Marko Jevtović (born 1987), tennis player
Marko Jevtović (born 1993), footballer
Milan Jevtović (born 1993), footballer
Nikola Jevtović (born 1989), basketball player
Zoran Jevtović (born 1958), footballer

Serbian surnames